Enzo Traverso (born 14 October 1957) is an Italian scholar of European intellectual history. He is the author of several books on critical theory, the Holocaust, Marxism, memory, totalitarianism, revolution, and contemporary historiography. His books have been translated into numerous languages. After living and working in France for over 25 years, he is currently the  Susan and Barton Winokur Professor in the Humanities at Cornell University.

Education
Enzo Traverso obtained a master's degree (Laurea) in modern history at the University of Genoa (Italy) in 1982. After moving to Paris in 1985 to further pursue his academic trajectory he completed his PhD program at School for Advanced Studies in the Social Sciences (EHESS) in 1989, under the direction of Michael Löwy. In 2009 he achieved the academic qualification of habilitation (accreditation to supervise research).

Career
From 1989 through 1991, he worked for the International Institute for Research and Education (IIRE) based in Amsterdam, and after that in the Library of contemporary international documentation (BDIC) in Nanterre. He also held the position of a lecturer in the Departement of Political science at the University of Paris VIII (1993–1995) and at School for Advanced Studies in the Social Sciences (EHESS) (1994–1997). In 1995 he was hired by the University of Picardie Jules Verne in Amiens as an assistant professor. He was later promoted to full professor, a post he held from 2009 to 2013, when he joined the faculty at Cornell.

Works

Original works

 Revolution: An Intellectual History, Verso, 2021, .
 Left-Wing Melancholia: Marxism, History, and Memory (New Directions in Critical Theory), Columbia University Press; 2nd Revised ed., 2017, .
Les Marxistes et la question juive, La Brèche-PEC, Montreuil, 1990.
 Les Juifs et l'Allemagne, de la symbiose judéo-allemande à la mémoire d'Auschwitz, La Découverte, Paris, 1992.
 Siegfried Kracauer. Itinéraire d’un intellectuel nomade, La Découverte, Paris, 1994.
 L'Histoire déchirée, essai sur Auschwitz et les intellectuels, Éditions du Cerf, Paris, 1997.
 Pour une critique de la barbarie moderne : écrits sur l'histoire des Juifs et l'antisémitisme, Éditions Page deux (Cahiers libres), Lausanne, 2000.
 Le Totalitarisme : Le XXe siècle en débat, 2001.
 La Violence nazie : Essai de généalogie historique, 2002, La Fabrique, Paris.
 La Pensée dispersée : Figures de l'exil judéo-allemand, 2004.
 Le Passé, mode d'emploi : Histoire, mémoire, politique, 2005, La Fabrique, Paris.
 À Feu et à sang : De la guerre civile européenne, 1914-1945, Stock, Paris, 2007.
 L'histoire comme champ de bataille : Interpréter les violences du XXe siècle, La Découverte, Paris, 2011.
 La fin de la modernité juive : Histoire d'un tournant conservateur, La Découverte, Paris, 2013.
 Mélancolie de gauche : La force d’une tradition cachée (XIXe-XXIe siècle), La Découverte, Paris, 2016.
 Les nouveaux visages du fascisme, Textuel, 2017

English translations
The Jewish Question: History of a Marxist Debate, Brill, Leiden, 2018
The End of Jewish Modernity, Pluto Press, London, 2016, translated by David Fernbach.
Fire and Blood: The European Civil War, 1914–1945, Verso, 2016
 The Origins of Nazi Violence, New Press, 2003, translated by Janet Lloyd.
 Understanding the Nazi Genocide: Marxism after Auschwitz, Pluto Press, London, 1999, translated by Peter Drucker.
 The Jews & Germany: From the "Judeo-German Symbiosis" to the Memory of Auschwitz, U. of Nebraska Press, Lincoln, 1995, translated by Daniel Weissbort.
 The Marxists and the Jewish question. The history of a Debate (1843-1943), Humanities Press, New Jersey, 1994, translated by Bernard Gibbons,

References

External links
Cornell University biography
"Nazism’s roots in European culture - Production line of murder" in Le Monde diplomatique, February 2005
Interview with Enzo Traverso: "History can be an ‘arm of power’" in Barcelona Metropolis Magazine, Winter, 2010.

1957 births
Living people
Historians of the Holocaust
Italian communists
Italian Trotskyists
Italian Marxist historians
Cornell University faculty
Academic staff of the School for Advanced Studies in the Social Sciences
20th-century Italian historians
21st-century Italian historians